Patterns is a 3-song EP by Long Beach, California band, Repeater.  This EP was produced and mixed by Ross Robinson (At The Drive-In, Korn, The Cure) and mastered by Alan Douches.  It has been well-received by reviewers.

Track listing 
 "Patterns"
 "Keep The Sun From Rising"
 "To Swallow Lost Goodbyes"

Personnel
Steve Krolikowski (vocals and guitar)
Rob Wallace (keyboards)
Victor Cuevas (bass)
Alex Forsythe (guitar)
Matt Hanief (drums)

Technical personnel
Produced, engineered and mixed By Ross Robinson
Mastered by Alan Douches

References

External links 
 Repeater, office website
Repeater, on Facebook
Repeater, on MySpace

2010 EPs
Repeater (band) albums